The University of Southern California (USC, SC, Southern Cal or SoCal) is a private research university in Los Angeles, California, United States. Founded in 1880 by Robert M. Widney, it is the oldest private research university in California. 

The university is composed of one liberal arts school, the Dornsife College of Letters, Arts and Sciences, and 22 undergraduate, graduate, and professional schools, enrolling roughly 21,000 undergraduate and 28,500 post-graduate students from all 50 U.S. states and more than 115 countries. It is also a member of the Association of American Universities, which it joined in 1969. USC is ranked as one of the top universities in the United States and admission to its programs is considered highly selective.

USC has graduated more alumni who have gone on to win Academy and Emmy Awards than any other institution in the world by a significant margin, in part due to the success of the School of Cinematic Arts, and has conferred degrees upon 29 living billionaires. USC's notable alumni include 11 Rhodes scholars and 12 Marshall scholars. , 10 Nobel laureates, six MacArthur Fellows, and one Turing Award winner have been affiliated with the university. USC is also the birthplace of technologies such as the Domain Name System, VoIP, DNA computing, transform coding, and dynamic programming.

USC sponsors a variety of intercollegiate sports and competes in the National Collegiate Athletic Association (NCAA) as a member of the Pac-12 Conference. Members of USC's sports teams, the Trojans, have won 107 NCAA team championships, ranking them third in the United States, and 412 NCAA individual championships, ranking them third in the United States and second among NCAA Division I schools. As of 2021, Trojan athletes have won 326 medals at the Olympic Games (153 golds, 96 silvers, and 77 bronzes), more than any other university in the United States. USC has had 537 football players drafted to the National Football League, the second-highest number of draftees in the country.

USC is the largest private employer in the Los Angeles area, with an estimated annual impact of $8 billion on the state of California.

History

The University of Southern California was founded following the efforts of Judge Robert M. Widney, who helped secure donations from several key figures in early Los Angeles history: a Protestant nurseryman, Ozro Childs; an Irish Catholic former governor, John Gately Downey; and a German Jewish banker, Isaias W. Hellman. The three donated 308 lots of land to establish the campus and provided the necessary seed money for the construction of the first buildings. Originally operated in affiliation with the Methodist Church, the school mandated from the start that "no student would be denied admission because of race". The university is no longer affiliated with any church, having severed formal ties in 1952.
When USC opened in 1880, the school had an enrollment of 53 students and a faculty of 10. Its first graduating class in 1884 was a class of three—two males and female valedictorian Minnie C. Miltimore.

USC students and athletes are known as Trojans, epitomized by the Trojan Shrine, nicknamed "Tommy Trojan", near the center of campus. Until 1912, USC students (especially athletes) were known as Fighting Methodists or Wesleyans, though neither name was approved by the university. During a fateful track and field meet with Stanford University, the USC team was beaten early and seemingly conclusively. After only the first few events, it seemed implausible USC would ever win, but the team fought back, winning many of the later events, to lose only by a slight margin. After this contest, Los Angeles Times sportswriter Owen Bird reported the USC athletes "fought on like the Trojans of antiquity", and the president of the university at the time, George F. Bovard, approved the name officially.

During World War II, USC was one of 131 colleges and universities nationally that took part in the V-12 Navy College Training Program, which offered students a path to a Navy commission.

Scandals

In the mid-2010s, USC was embroiled in numerous controversies and scandals. On May 1, 2014, USC was named as one of many higher-education institutions under investigation by the Office of Civil Rights for potential Title IX violations by Barack Obama's White House Task Force to Protect Students from Sexual Assault. USC is also under a concurrent Title IX investigation for potential anti-male bias in disciplinary proceedings, as well as denial of counseling resources to male students, . In 2018, USC was ordered to pay $111,965 in legal fees to a male student accused of rape after the Title IX investigation run by Gretchen Means Gaspari was deemed unfair. In 2020, USC was penalized for its faulty Title IX processes by the U.S. Department of Education's Office for Civil Rights.

The following year, the Los Angeles Times broke another story about USC focusing on George Tyndall, a gynecologist accused of abusing 52 patients at USC. The reports span from 1990 to 2016, and include using racist and sexual language, conducting exams without gloves, and taking pictures of his patients' genitals. Inside Higher Ed noted that "other incidents in which the university is perceived to have failed to act on misconduct by powerful officials" have occurred, when it reported that the university's president, C. L. Max Nikias, was resigning. Tyndall was fired in 2017 after reaching a settlement with the university. As of June 1, 2018, 401 people had contacted a special hotline to receive complaints about the doctor. On October 18, nearly 100 women were reported to have filed new lawsuits against the university, bringing the number of accusations up to over 500 current and former students. A series of settlements to the victims totalled to over $1.1 billion, the largest sexual abuse settlement of any university.

In 2016, Carmen Puliafito resigned as dean of the Keck School of Medicine. In 2017, the Los Angeles Times revealed that Puliafito had engaged in parties with young recreational drug users and prostitutes, including at the Keck School's offices, with harm to at least one user.  His resignation had occurred shortly after a police investigation of those activities.

In 2018, Dennis Kelly resigned as men's health physician at USC after almost 20 years. The following year, he was accused by six male graduate students of inappropriate conduct. By 2020, 49 accusations of misconduct had been made against Dr. Kelly, all by gay or bisexual students and former students.

USC was one of several universities involved in the 2019 college admissions bribery scandal. On March 12, 2019, three coaches and one athletic director were charged with accepting bribes from wealthy families for fraudulently facilitating their children's admission to USC. Among the 12 university personnel charged for their involvement in the scandal nationwide, four were associated with USC. Following its involvement in the admissions scandal, the university was derided by its old nickname: the "University of Spoiled Children", a nickname it had previously worked hard to shed.

A 2020 investigative report by the Los Angeles Times revealed that USC granted a bachelor's and master's degree to Khalifa bin Hamad bin Khalifa Al Thani, a Qatari royal, while allowing him to avoid rules and procedures that apply to other students. He was accepted to USC as a transfer student from Los Angeles Mission College after his mother, Moza bint Nasser, met USC president C. L. Max Nikias in 2012 in Los Angeles, California, at the behest of USC trustee Tom Barrack. An adjunct professor said that Al Thani's handlers delivered a final paper in a bag that also contained a Rolex watch, which the adjunct returned.

Campus

The campus's boundaries are Jefferson Boulevard on the north and northeast, Figueroa Street on the southeast, Exposition Boulevard on the south, and Vermont Avenue on the west. Since the 1960s, through-campus vehicle traffic has been either severely restricted or entirely prohibited on some thoroughfares. The University Park campus is within walking distance to Los Angeles landmarks such as the Shrine Auditorium and Los Angeles Memorial Coliseum, which is operated and managed by the university. Most buildings are in the Romanesque Revival style, although some dormitories, engineering buildings, and physical sciences labs are of various Modernist styles (especially two large Brutalist dormitories at the campus's northern edge) that sharply contrast with the predominantly red-brick campus. Widney Alumni House, built in 1880, is the oldest university building in Southern California. In recent years the campus has been renovated to remove the vestiges of old roads and replace them with traditional university quads and gardens. The historic portion of the main campus was listed on the National Register of Historic Places in 2015.

In addition, the Children's Hospital Los Angeles is staffed by USC faculty from the Keck School of Medicine, and is often referred to as USC's third campus. USC also operates an Orange County center in Irvine for business, pharmacy, social work, and education, and the Information Sciences Institute, with centers in Arlington, Virginia, and Marina del Rey.

The Price School of Public Policy also runs a satellite campus in Sacramento. In 2005, USC established a federal relations office in Washington, DC. A Health Sciences Alhambra campus holds the Primary Care Physician Assistant Program, the Institute for Health Promotion and Disease Prevention Research (IPR), and the Masters in Public Health Program.

USC was developed under two master plans drafted and implemented some 40 years apart. The first was prepared by the Parkinsons in 1920, which guided much of the campus's early construction and established its Romanesque style and 45-degree building orientation.

The second and largest master plan was prepared in 1961 under the supervision of President Norman Topping, campus development director Anthony Lazzaro, and architect William Pereira. This plan annexed a great deal of the surrounding city, and many of the older nonuniversity structures within the new boundaries were leveled. Most of the Pereira buildings were constructed in the 1970s. Pereira maintained a predominantly red-brick architecture for the new buildings, but infused them with his trademark technomodernism stylings. More recently under President C. L. Max Nikias, the architectural orientation of the campus has moved towards a Gothic Revival style, taking cues from the scholastic styles of Oxford University and Harvard University, while underpinning USC's own historic identity that is present in the red-brick construction.

USC's role in making visible and sustained improvements in the neighborhoods surrounding both the University Park and Health Sciences campuses earned it the distinction of College of the Year 2000 by the Time/Princeton Review College Guide.

Roughly half of the university's students volunteer in community-service programs in neighborhoods around campus and throughout Los Angeles. These outreach programs, as well as previous administrations' commitment to remaining in South Los Angeles amid widespread calls to move the campus following the 1965 Watts Riots, are credited for the safety of the university during the 1992 Los Angeles Riots. (That the university emerged from the riots completely unscathed is all the more remarkable in light of the complete destruction of several strip malls in the area, including one just across Vermont Avenue from the campus's western security fence.)

The ZIP Code for USC is 90089 and that of the surrounding University Park community is 90007.

USC has an endowment of $8.1 billion and carries out nearly $1 billion per year in sponsored research. USC became the only university to receive eight separate nine-figure gifts: $120 million from Ambassador Walter Annenberg to create the Annenberg Center for Communication and a later additional gift of $100 million for the USC Annenberg School for Communication; $112.5 million from Alfred Mann to establish the Alfred E. Mann Institute for Biomedical Engineering; $110 million from the W. M. Keck Foundation for USC's School of Medicine; $150 million from the W. M. Keck Foundation for USC's School of Medicine; $175 million from George Lucas to the USC School of Cinema-Television, now renamed USC School of Cinematic Arts, $200 million from Dana and David Dornsife for USC's College of Letters, Arts and Sciences to support undergraduate and Ph.D. programs, $110 million from John and Julie Mork for undergraduate scholarships, and $200 million from Larry Ellison to launch the Lawrence J. Ellison Institute for Transformative Medicine.

University Village
In 1999, USC purchased the University Park shopping center, which was soon demolished in 2014. In September of the same year, the university began construction on USC Village, a 1.25-million-square-foot residential and retail center directly adjacent to USC's University Park campus on 15 acres of land owned by the university. The USC Village has over 130,000 square feet of retail space on the ground floor, with student housing on the four floors above. The $700 million project is the biggest development in the history of USC and is also one of the largest in the history of South Los Angeles. With a grand opening held on August 17, 2017, the USC Village includes a Trader Joe's, a Target, a fitness center, restaurants, outdoor dining, 400 retail parking spots, a community room, and housing for 2,700 students.

Health Sciences campus

The  campus is home to the region's first and oldest medical and pharmacy schools, as well as acclaimed programs in occupational therapy, physical therapy, physician assistant, and pharmacy (which are respectively ranked No. 1, No. 4, No. 10, No. 14 by U.S. News & World Report in 2023).

In addition to the Los Angeles County+USC Medical Center, which is one of the nation's largest teaching hospitals, the campus includes three patient care facilities: USC Norris Comprehensive Cancer Center, Keck Hospital of USC, and the USC Eye Institute. USC faculty staffs these and many other hospitals in Southern California, including the internationally acclaimed Children's Hospital Los Angeles. The health sciences campus is also home to the USC School of Pharmacy and several research buildings such as USC/Norris Cancer Research Tower, Institute for Genetic Medicine, Zilkha Neurogenetic Institute, Harlyne J. Norris Cancer Research Tower and Eli and Edythe Broad Center for Regenerative Medicine and Stem Cell Research.

The Keck Hospital of USC is ranked No. 7 out of 420 hospitals in the State of California and ranks in the top twenty nationally for specialities by U.S. News & World Report, including cancer, cardiology, gastroenterology, and geriatrics. 

In July 2013, the university expanded its medical services into the foothill communities of northern Los Angeles when it acquired the 185 bed Verdugo Hills Hospital in Glendale, California. USC planned on making at least $30 million in capital improvements to the facility, which was officially renamed USC Verdugo Hills Hospital. This 40-year-old hospital provides the community a 24-hour emergency department, primary stroke center, maternity/labor and delivery, cardiac rehabilitation, and imaging and diagnostic services.

In July 2022 the university acquired the 348 bed Methodist Hospital of Southern California in Arcadia, California. Renamed USC Arcadia Hospital it is a full-service community hospital offering advanced cardiovascular services including cardiac catheterization, electrophysiology and open-heart surgery. Los Angeles County has designated it as both a heart attack receiving center and a comprehensive stroke center, as well as an Emergency Department Approved for Pediatrics. The hospital also offers a variety of surgical services in orthopaedics, neurosurgery, obstetrics, gynecology, and cancer care, plus physical rehabilitation and many other medical specialties.

USC physicians serve more than one million patients each year.

Public transit
USC is served by several rapid transit stations. The Metro E Line light rail service between Downtown Los Angeles and Santa Monica wraps around the south and eastern edges of the University Park campus. The E Line has three stations in the vicinity of the USC main campus: Jefferson/USC Station, Expo Park/USC Station, and Vermont/Expo Station.

The Metro J Line bus service serves both the University Park campus at 37th Street/USC station and the Health Sciences campus at LA County+USC Medical Center station.

In addition, both campuses are served by several Metro and municipal bus routes.

Former agricultural college campus
Chaffey College was founded in 1883 in the city of Ontario, California, as an agricultural college branch campus of USC under the name of Chaffey College of Agriculture of the University of Southern California. USC ran the Chaffey College of Agriculture until financial troubles closed the school in 1901. In 1906, the school was reopened by the municipal and regional government and thus officially separated from USC. Renamed as Chaffey College, it now exists as a community college as part of the California Community College System.

Organization and administration

USC is a private public-benefit nonprofit corporation controlled by a board of trustees composed of 50 voting members and several life trustees, honorary trustees, and trustees emeriti who do not vote. Voting members of the Board of Trustees are elected for five-year terms. One-fifth of the Trustees stand for re-election each year, and votes are cast only by the trustees not standing for election. Trustees tend to be high-ranking executives of large corporations (both domestic and international), successful alumni, members of the upper echelons of university administration, or some combination of the three.

The university administration consists of a president, a provost, several vice-presidents of various departments, a treasurer, a chief information officer, and an athletic director. The current president is Carol Folt who on July 1, 2019, succeeded Board of Trustee member Wanda Austin who had been appointed the interim president by the Board when the former president C. L. Max Nikias resigned in 2018.

The USC Dana and David Dornsife College of Letters, Arts, and Sciences, the Graduate School, and the 20 professional schools are each led by an academic dean. USC occasionally awards emeritus titles to former administrators. There are six administrators emeriti.

The University of Southern California's 20 professional schools include the USC Leventhal School of Accounting, USC School of Architecture, USC Roski School of Art and Design, USC Iovine and Young Academy, USC Marshall School of Business, USC School of Cinematic Arts, USC Annenberg School for Communication and Journalism, USC Glorya Kaufman School of Dance, Herman Ostrow School of Dentistry of USC, USC School of Dramatic Arts, USC Rossier School of Education, USC Viterbi School of Engineering, USC Leonard Davis School of Gerontology, USC Gould School of Law, Keck School of Medicine of USC, USC Thornton School of Music, USC School of Pharmacy, USC Bovard College, USC Sol Price School of Public Policy, and USC Suzanne Dworak-Peck School of Social Work.

Student government

The Undergraduate Student Government (USG) is the official representative government of the undergraduate students at USC. It consists of a popularly elected president and vice president who lead an appointed executive cabinet, a popularly elected legislative branch, and judicial oversight. The executive cabinet oversees funding, communications, programming, and advocacy work. All USG activities are funded by the student activity fee. In addition to USG, residents within university housing are represented and governed by the Residential Housing Association (RHA), which is divided by residence hall. The Graduate Student Government (GSG) consists of senators elected by the students of each school proportional to its enrollment and its activities are funded by a graduate and professional student activity fee.

List of university presidents
Marion M. Bovard (1880–1891)
Joseph P. Widney (1892–1895)
George W. White (1895–1899)
George F. Bovard (1903–1921)
Rufus B. von KleinSmid (1921–1947)
Fred D. Fagg, Jr. (1947–1957)
Norman Topping (1958–1970)
John R. Hubbard (1970–1980)
James H. Zumberge (1980–1991)
Steven B. Sample (1991–2010)
C. L. Max Nikias (2010–2018)
Wanda Austin (interim) (2018–2019)
Carol Folt (2019–present)

Department of Public Safety

The USC Department of Public Safety (DPS) is one of the largest campus law enforcement agencies in the United States, currently employing 306 full-time personnel, including approximately 96 armed Public Safety Officers, 120 unarmed Community Service Officers, 60 CCTV monitors and dispatchers, and 30 part-time student workers. DPS's patrol and response jurisdiction includes a 2.5 square mile area around each USC campus. The Department of Public Safety headquarters is on the University Park campus, and there are substations in the University Village and on the Health Sciences campus. The department operates 24 hours a day, 365 days a year. All USC Public Safety Officers are required to be police academy graduates so that under California Penal Code statute they can be granted peace officer power of arrest authority while on duty, enforce state laws and local city municipal codes, and investigate crimes.

The department has a formal working relationship with the Los Angeles Police Department (LAPD), which includes USC paying for newly hired Public Safety Officers to attend the six month-long Los Angeles Police Academy. A special joint USC/LAPD crime task force composed of USC DPS personnel and approximately 40 selected Los Angeles police officers, including a dedicated specially trained LAPD SWAT team, is assigned exclusively to the USC campus community to address crime and quality of life issues.

Academics

USC is a large, primarily residential research university. The majority of the student body was undergraduate until 2007, when graduate student enrollment began to exceed undergraduate. The four-year, full-time undergraduate instructional program is classified as "balanced arts & sciences/professions" with a high graduate coexistence. Admissions are characterized as "most selective, lower transfer in"; 95 undergraduate majors and 147 academic and professional minors are offered. The graduate program is classified as "comprehensive" and offers 134 master's, doctoral, and professional degrees through 20 professional schools. USC is accredited by the Western Association of Schools and Colleges. USC's academic departments fall either under the general liberal arts and sciences of the Dana and David Dornsife College of Letters, Arts, and Sciences for undergraduates, the Graduate School for graduates, or the university's 20 professional schools.

USC presently has six Nobel Laureates on staff, eight Rhodes Scholars, six MacArthur Fellows, 181 Fulbright Scholars, one Turing Award winner, three winners of the National Medal of Arts, one winner of the National Humanities Medal, three winners of the National Medal of Science, and three winners of the National Medal of Technology and Innovation among its alumni and faculty. In addition to its academic awards, USC has produced the most Oscar winners out of any institution in the world by a significant margin.

The USC Dana and David Dornsife College of Letters, Arts, and Sciences, the oldest and largest of the USC schools, grants undergraduate degrees in more than 130 majors and minors across the humanities, social sciences, and natural/physical sciences, and offers doctoral and masters programs in more than 20 fields. Dornsife College is responsible for the general education program for all USC undergraduates and houses a full-time faculty of approximately 700, more than 6500 undergraduate majors (roughly half the total USC undergraduate population), and 1200 doctoral students. In addition to 30 academic departments, the college also houses dozens of research centers and institutes. In the 2008–2009 academic year, 4,400 undergraduate degrees and 5,500 advanced degrees were awarded. Formerly called "USC College of Letters, Arts & Sciences", the college received a $200 million gift from USC trustees Dana and David Dornsife on March 23, 2011, after which the college was renamed in their honor, following the naming pattern of other professional schools and departments at the university. All Ph.D. degrees awarded at USC and most master's degrees are under the jurisdiction of the Graduate School. Professional degrees are awarded by each of the respective professional schools.

The School of Cinematic Arts, the oldest and largest film school in the country, confers degrees in six different programs. As the university administration considered cinematic skills too valuable to be kept to film industry professionals, the school opened its classes to the university at large in 1998. In 2001, the film school added an Interactive Media & Games Division studying stereoscopic cinema, panoramic cinema, immersive cinema, interactive cinema, video games, virtual reality, and mobile media. In September 2006, George Lucas donated $175 million to expand the film school, which at the time was the largest single donation to USC (and its fifth over $100 million). The donation will be used to build new structures and expand the faculty. The acceptance rate to the School of Cinematic Arts has consistently remained between 4-6% for the past several years.

The USC School of Architecture was established in 1916, the first in Southern California. From at least 1972 to 1976, and likely for a number of years prior to 1972, it was called The School of Architecture and Fine Art. The School of Fine Art (known as SOFA for a number of years after Architecture and Fine Art separated) was eventually named the Roski School of Fine Arts in 2006 during a ceremony to open the then-new Masters of Fine Art building, which occupies the previous and completely refurbished Lucky Blue Jean factory. This small department grew rapidly with the help of the Allied Architects of Los Angeles. A separate School of Architecture was organized in September 1925. The school has been home to teachers such as Richard Neutra, Ralph Knowles, James Steele, A. Quincy Jones, William Pereira and Pierre Koenig. The school of architecture also claims notable alumni Frank Gehry, Jon Jerde, Thom Mayne, Raphael Soriano, Gregory Ain, and Pierre Koenig. Two of the alumni have become Pritzker Prize winners. In 2006, Qingyun Ma, a distinguished Shanghai-based architect, was named dean of the school.

The Andrew and Erna Viterbi School of Engineering is headed by Dean Yannis Yortsos. Previously known as the USC School of Engineering, it was renamed on March 2, 2004, in honor of Qualcomm co-founder Andrew Viterbi and his wife Erna, who had donated $52 million to the school. Viterbi School of Engineering has been ranked No. 11 and No. 9 in the United States in U.S. News & World Reports engineering rankings for 2018 and 2019 respectively.

The Annenberg School for Communication & Journalism, founded in 1971, is one of the two communication programs in the country endowed by Walter Annenberg (the other is at the University of Pennsylvania). The School of Journalism, which became part of the School for Communication in 1994, features a core curriculum that requires students to devote themselves equally to print, broadcast and online media for the first year of study. The journalism school consistently ranks among the nation's top undergraduate journalism schools. USC's Annenberg School's endowment rose from $7.5 million to $218 million between 1996 and 2007. In 2015, the new building named for Wallis Annenberg started serving all faculty and students.

The Herman Ostrow School of Dentistry at the University of Southern California was established in 1897 as The College of Dentistry, and today, awards undergraduate and graduate degrees. Headed by Dean Avishai Sadan, D.M.D., the school traditionally has maintained five Divisions: Academic Affairs & Student Life, Clinical Affairs, Continuing Education, Research, and Community Health Programs and Hospital Affairs. In 2006, the USC Department of Physical Therapy and Biokinesiology, and the USC Department of Occupational Science and Occupational Therapy, which both had previously been organized as "Independent Health Professions" programs at the USC College of Letters, Arts, and Sciences, were administratively aligned under the School of Dentistry and renamed "Divisions", bringing the total number of Divisions at the School of Dentistry to seven. In 2010, alumnus Herman Ostrow donated $35 million to name the school the Herman Ostrow School of Dentistry. In 2013, the school introduced an eighth division, and in 2014, a $20 million gift endowed and named the USC Mrs. T.H. Chan Division of Occupational Science and Occupational Therapy.

USC collaborated with Shanghai Jiao Tong University to offer the USC (Executive) EMBA program in Shanghai. USC Dornsife also operates two international study centers in Paris and Madrid. The Marshall School of Business has satellite campuses in Orange County and San Diego.

In 2012, USC established the Glorya Kaufman School of Dance, the university's first new school in 40 years, which was a gift from philanthropist Glorya Kaufman. The USC Kaufman School offers individual classes in technique, performance, choreography, production, theory and history open to all students at USC. In the fall of 2015, the USC Glorya Kaufman School of Dance began to offer a Bachelor of Fine Arts degree to a select number of undergraduates who wish to pursue dance as their major. This four-year professional degree is housed in the state-of-the-art Glorya Kaufman International Dance Center.

In 2015, USC established the Bovard College, which offers graduate-level programs in Human Resource Management, Project Management, and Criminal Justice. The college is named after Emma Bovard, who was one of the first students to enroll at USC in 1880.

University library system

The USC Libraries are among the oldest private academic research libraries in California. For more than a century USC has been building collections in support of the university's teaching and research interests. Especially noteworthy collections include American literature, Cinema-Television including the Warner Bros. studio archives, European philosophy, gerontology, German exile literature, international relations, Korean studies, studies of Latin America, natural history, Southern California history, and the University Archives.

The USC Warner Bros. Archives is the largest single studio collection in the world. Donated in 1977 to the University of Southern California's School of Cinematic Arts by Warner Communications, the WBA houses departmental records that detail Warner Bros. activities from the studio's first major feature, My Four Years in Germany (1918), to its sale to Seven Arts in 1968.

Announced in June 2006, the testimony of 52,000 survivors, rescuers, and others involved in The Holocaust is housed in the USC College of Letters, Arts & Sciences as a part of the USC Shoah Foundation Institute for Visual History and Education.

In addition to the Shoah Foundation, the USC Libraries digital collection highlights include photographs from the California Historical Society, Korean American Archives Automobile Club of Southern California, and the Chinese Historical Society of Southern California. The USC Digital Library provides a wealth of primary and original source material in a variety of formats.

In October 2010, the collections at ONE National Gay & Lesbian Archives, the largest repository for documents from the lesbian, gay, bisexual and transgender (LGBT) community in the world, became a part of the USC Libraries system. The collections at ONE include over two million archival items documenting LGBT history including periodicals; books; film, video and audio recordings; photographs; artworks; ephemera, such clothing, costumes, and buttons; organizational records; and personal paper.

Annually, reference transactions number close to 50,000 and approximately 1,100 instructional presentations are made to 16,000 participants. The University of Southern California Library system is among the top 35 largest university library systems in the United States.

The Leavey Library is the undergraduate library and is open 24 hours a day. The newly open basement has many discussion tables for students to share thoughts and have group discussions. The Edward L. Doheny, Jr. Memorial Library is the main research library on campus.

Rankings

USC was ranked 22nd in U.S. News & World Reports 2020 annual ranking of national universities. In the Niche Best Colleges rankings, USC ranked 19th overall for 2020 based on academics and quality of student life. USC is ranked 32nd among national universities in the U.S. and 55th in the world by the Academic Ranking of World Universities, and 13th (tied with seven other universities) among national universities by The Center for Measuring University Performance. In 2015, USA Today ranked USC 22nd overall for American universities based on data from College Factual. Among top 25 universities, USC was ranked by U.S. News & World Report as having the 4th most economically diverse student body. Reuters ranked USC as the 14th most innovative university in the world in 2015, as measured by the university's global commercial impact and patents granted. USC was ranked 15th overall in the 2016 inaugural Wall Street Journal/Times Higher Education ranking of U.S. colleges.

In 2016, USC was ranked as a "Top 10 Dream College" according to The Princeton Review, as conferred from a survey of 10,000 respondents. USC appeared in the top 10 list for both parents and students.

On the 2011 "Green Report Card", issued by the Sustainable Endowments Institute, the university received a B−.

The Annenberg School for Communication and Journalism was ranked 1st in 2014 by USA Today. In its 2020 rankings, U.S. News & World Report rates USC's School of Law as 17th, the Marshall School of Business tied for 17th with the USC Leventhal School of Accounting 7th and the Lloyd Greif Center for Entrepreneurial Studies 9th; the Keck School of Medicine of USC was ranked tied for 30th in research and tied for 53rd in primary care, the Viterbi School of Engineering 9th, the Rossier School of Education 12th, the Roski School of Fine Arts graduate program 69th, the Sol Price School of Public Policy 3rd, the USC School of Social Work 25th, and the USC School of Pharmacy tied for 9th. USC's graduate programs in occupational therapy and physical therapy are ranked the nation's 1st and 4th best programs, respectively, for 2021 by U.S. News & World Report. The Philosophical Gourmet Report in 2015 ranked USC's graduate philosophy program as 8th nationally.                                 

The Hollywood Reporter ranked the School of Cinematic Arts the No. 1 film school in the United States for the third year in a row in 2014. In addition, USA Today ranked the School of Cinematic Arts the No. 1 film school in the United States in 2014. The program's range of classes, facilities, and close proximity to the industry were the primary reasons for this ranking.

USA Today ranked the USC Marshall School of Business as the No. 3 school to study undergraduate business in the nation, . In 2015, Forbes ranked the USC Marshall School of Business 3rd in the nation in producing graduates who are most satisfied with their jobs.

The Princeton Review ranked USC video game design program as 1st out of 150 schools in North America. The university's video game design programs are interdisciplinary, involving the Interactive Media & Games Division of the School of Cinematic Arts and the CS Games program in the Department of Computer Science at the USC Viterbi School of Engineering.

The Academic Ranking of World Universities in 2015 ranked USC's combined departments of engineering and computer sciences as 10th in the world, social sciences 31st, and economics and business departments 29th. 

Student body

USC has a total enrollment of roughly 47,500 students, of which 20,000 are at the undergraduate and 27,500 at the graduate and professional levels. Approximately 53% of students are female and 47% are male. For the entering first-year class in 2020, 43% of incoming students are drawn from California, 42% from the rest of the United States, and 15% from abroad. USC's student body encompasses 12,300 international students, the second most out of all universities in the United States. Of the regularly enrolled international students, the most represented countries/regions are China (not including Hong Kong, Macau and Taiwan not included), India, South Korea, and Taiwan, in that order.

Like other private universities, the nominal cost of attendance is high; however, the university's large endowment and significant revenue streams allow it to offer generous financial aid packages. USC also offer some very competitive and highly valued merit-based scholarships (the full-tuition, four-year Mork Family, Stamps and Trustee scholarships; the half-tuition Presidential Scholarship; the one-quarter tuition Deans Scholarship), with only 5.5% of scholarship applicants being selected as finalists for the final interview invitation at the USC campus in Spring. This makes USC one of the highest ranked universities to offer half-tuition and full-tuition merit-based scholarships. These factors have propelled USC into being the 4th most economically diverse university in the nation.

USC enrolls one of the largest amounts of National Merit Scholars of any university, offering finalists in the program its half-tuition Presidential Scholarship. As of 2021, about 72% of the student body receives about $810 million in financial aid annually.

Twenty percent of admitted and attending students are SCions, or students with familial ties to USC, while 14 percent are the first generation in their family to attend any form of college. Twenty-four percent of undergraduates at USC are Pell Grant-eligible, which is defined by having come from a family household income of less than $50,000. There are over 375,000 living Trojan alumni.
 
The USC-MSA reference is a numbering system developed by the Muslim Students' Association of the University of Southern California to access their database of the six major Hadith collections. Although the project currently parked, the referencing remains widely used throughout the Internet.

Undergraduate admissions

USC is ranked by U.S. News & World Report as "Most Selective," and Princeton Review rates its admissions selectivity of 98 out of 99. Over 70,000 students applied for admission to the undergraduate class entering in 2021, with 12% being admitted.

Among enrolled freshman for Fall 2019, the interquartile (middle 50%) range of SAT scores was 670-740 for evidence-based reading and writing, 680-790 for math, and 1370-1520 for the composite. The middle 50% ACT score range was 28-34 for math, 32-35 for English, and 31-34 for the composite. USC was ranked the 10th most applied to university in the nation for fall 2014 by U.S. News & World Report.

Faculty and research

The university is classified among "R1: Doctoral Universities – Very high research activity". According to the National Science Foundation, USC spent $891 million on research and development in 2018, ranking it 23rd in the nation.

USC employs approximately 4,706 full-time faculty, 1,816 part-time faculty, 16,614 staff members, and 4,817 student workers. 350 postdoctoral fellows are supported along with over 800 medical residents. Among the USC faculty, 17 are members of the National Academy of Sciences, 16 are members of the National Academy of Medicine, 37 are members of the National Academy of Engineering, 97 are members of the American Association for the Advancement of Science, and 34 are members of the American Academy of Arts and Sciences, 5 to the American Philosophical Society, and 14 to the National Academy of Public Administration. 29 USC faculty are listed as among the "Highly Cited" in the Institute for Scientific Information database. George Olah won the 1994 Nobel Prize in Chemistry and was the founding director of the Loker Hydrocarbon Research Institute. Leonard Adleman won the Turing Award in 2003. Arieh Warshel won the 2013 Nobel Prize in Chemistry.

The university also supports the Pacific Council on International Policy through joint programming, leadership collaboration, and facilitated connections among students, faculty, and Pacific Council members.

The university has two National Science Foundation–funded Engineering Research Centers: the Integrated Media Systems Center and the Center for Biomimetic Microelectronic Systems. The Department of Homeland Security selected USC as its first Homeland Security Center of Excellence. Since 1991, USC has been the headquarters of the NSF and USGS funded Southern California Earthquake Center (SCEC). The University of Southern California is a founding and charter member of CENIC, the Corporation for Education Network Initiatives in California, the nonprofit organization, which provides extremely high-performance Internet-based networking to California's K-20 research and education community. USC researcher Jonathan Postel was an editor of communications-protocol for the fledgling internet, also known as ARPANET, for which USC was one of the earliest nodes.

In July 2016 USC became home to the world's most powerful quantum computer, housed in a super-cooled, magnetically shielded facility at the USC Information Sciences Institute, the only other commercially available quantum computing system operated jointly by NASA and Google.

Notable USC faculty include or have included the following: Leonard Adleman, Richard Bellman, Aimee Bender, Barry Boehm, Warren Bennis, Todd Boyd, T.C. Boyle, Leo Buscaglia, Drew Casper, Manuel Castells, Erwin Chemerinsky, George V. Chilingar, Thomas Crow, António Damásio, Francis De Erdely, Percival Everett, Murray Gell-Mann, Seymour Ginsburg, G. Thomas Goodnight, Jane Goodall, Solomon Golomb, Midori Goto, Susan Estrich, Janet Fitch, Tomlinson Holman, Jascha Heifetz, Henry Jenkins, Thomas H. Jordan, Mark Kac, Pierre Koenig, Neil Leach, Leonard Maltin, Daniel L. McFadden, Viet Thanh Nguyen, George Olah, Scott Page, Tim Page (music critic), Simon Ramo, Claudia Rankine, Irving Reed, Jacob Soll, Michael Waterman, Frank Gehry, Arieh Warshel, Lloyd Welch, Jonathan Taplin, and Diane Winston.

Athletics

The USC Trojans participate in the NCAA Division I Football Bowl Subdivision (FBS) as a member of the Pac-12 Conference. It will move to the Big Ten Conference in 2024. USC student athletes have won 123 total team national championships, 97 for men and 26 for women, including non-NCAA championships. Of this total, 80 and 14 are NCAA National Championships for men and women, respectively. The NCAA does not include college football championships in its calculation. Although there are multiple organizations that name national championships, USC claims 11 football championships. The men's 361 Individual Championships are the second-best in the nation and 53 ahead of third place, Texas Longhorns. USC's cross-town rival is the University of California, Los Angeles (UCLA), with whom there is fierce athletic and scholastic competition. USC's rivalry with Notre Dame predates the UCLA rivalry by three years. The Notre Dame rivalry stems mainly from the annual football game played between these two universities and is considered one of the greatest rivalries in college athletics.

USC has won 107 NCAA team championships, 3rd behind Stanford (126) and cross-town rival UCLA (119). The Trojans have also won at least one national team title in 26 consecutive years (1959–60 to 1984–85). USC won the National College All-Sports Championship, an annual ranking by USA Today of the country's top athletic programs, 6 times since its inception in 1971. Four Trojans have won the James E. Sullivan Award as the top amateur athlete in America: diver Sammy Lee (1953), shot putter Parry O'Brien (1959), swimmer John Naber (1977) and swimmer Janet Evans (1989).

From the 1904 Summer Olympics through the 2014 Winter Olympics, 632 Trojan athletes have competed in the Games, taking home 144 gold medals, 93 silver and 72 bronze. If it were an independent country, USC would be ranked 13th in the world in 2016 in terms of medals. Since 1912, USC is the only university in the world to have a gold medal-winning athlete in every summer Olympiad.

Men's sports

In men's sports, USC has won 97 team national championships (84 NCAA titles) – more than any other school – and male athletes have won a record 303 individual NCAA titles. The Trojans have won 26 championships in track and field, 21 in tennis, 12 in baseball, 9 in swimming and diving, 9 in water polo, 6 in volleyball, 2 in indoor track and field, and 1 in gymnastics. USC's men's basketball has appeared in the NCAA tournament 15 times, and made 2 NCAA Final Four appearances.

The USC football program has historically ranked among the best in Division I FBS. The Trojans football team has won 11 national championships. Seven players have won the Heisman Trophy, although the school claims six, after alleged violations involving Reggie Bush. , 537 Trojans have been taken in the NFL draft, making it the school with the most NFL draft picks.

For the 2015 season, USC football was ranked 1st overall in recruiting by Rivals.com, with 4 five-star commits, 17 four-star commits, and 5 three-star commits.

Women's sports
Women's teams have earned 27 national championships. The Women of Troy have brought home 64 individual NCAA crowns. Two Women of Troy athletes have won the Honda-Broderick Cup as the top collegiate woman athlete of the year: Cheryl Miller (1983–84) and Angela Williams (2001–02). And Trojan women have won 8 Honda Awards, as the top female athlete in their sport.

The Women of Troy have won 7 championships in tennis, 6 in volleyball, 4 in water polo, 3 in golf, 2 in basketball, 2 in beach volleyball, 1 in swimming and diving, 2 in track and field and 2 in soccer.

Traditions and student activities

As one of the oldest universities in California, the University of Southern California has a number of traditions. USC's official fight song is "Fight On", which was composed in 1922 by USC dental student Milo Sweet with lyrics by Sweet and Glen Grant.

Rivalries

USC has rivalries with multiple schools. Although generally limited to football, USC has a major rivalry with Notre Dame. The annual game is played for the Jeweled Shillelagh. The rivalry has featured more national championship teams, Heisman trophy winners, All-Americans, and future NFL hall-of-famers than any other collegiate match-up. The two schools have kept the annual game on their schedules since 1926 (except 1942–44 because of World War II travel restrictions and 2020 because of the COVID-19 Pandemic) and the game is often referred to as the greatest intersectional rivalry in college football.Dave Revsine, Michigan, Ohio State set bar high for other rivalries , ESPN.com, November 24, 2006, Accessed March 24, 2009.Adam Rose, The Color of Misery , LATimes.com, October 20, 2007, Accessed March 24, 2009.

USC's most famous rival is UCLA with whom there is fierce athletic and scholastic competition. Until 1982, the two schools also shared the same football stadium, the Los Angeles Memorial Coliseum. The victor of the annual football game takes home the Victory Bell. The Trojans and Bruins also compete in a year-long all-sports competition for the Lexus Gauntlet Trophy. Pranks between UCLA and USC were commonplace several decades ago. Both universities have cracked down on pranks since a 1989 incident when USC students released hundreds of crickets into the main UCLA library during finals week. Days before a clash between rivals UCLA and USC in 2009, the Bruins mascot was vandalized. It was splashed in cardinal and gold paint, USC's official colors, sparking memories of pranks played in the years earlier. The week preceding the annual football matchup with UCLA is known as "Troy Week" and features a number of traditions including CONQUEST! "The Ultimate Trojan Experience", Save Tommy Night, the CONQUEST! Bonfire, and all-night vigils by the USC Helenes and Trojan Knights to protect the campus from UCLA Bruins.

In addition, USC has rivalries with other Pac-12 schools, particularly the Stanford Cardinal as they are the only two private universities in the Pac-12 Conference and are situated at opposing regions of California, as well as being the two oldest private research universities in California, 1880 and 1891, respectively. Recently, a rivalry has begun to exist between USC and the University of Oregon because of the two universities' dominant football programs with each school often serving as the toughest match-up on the opponent's schedule.

Mascots
Traveler, a white Andalusian horse, is the university's official mascot. Traveler I first appeared at a football game in 1961 ridden by Richard Saukko. The current horse is known as Traveler IX.

Tommy Trojan, officially known as the Trojan Shrine, is a bronze statue in the model of a Trojan warrior at the center of campus. It is commonly mistaken as the school's official mascot. The statue was modeled after Trojan football players and is engraved with the ideal characteristics of a Trojan. It is a popular meeting point for students and a landmark for visitors.

In the 1940s, George Tirebiter, a car-chasing dog, was the most popular unofficial mascot. It gained fame among students after it bit the mascot of the UCLA Bruins. The dog was kept by the Trojan Knights and was known to chase down cars on Trousdale Parkway, which runs through campus. After the original dog died, three others succeeded it. A statue was built in 2006 to honor the unofficial mascot.

Marching band

The Spirit of Troy is USC's marching band and has been featured in at least 10 major movies and performed in both the 1932 and 1984 Summer Olympics in Los Angeles. They have also performed on television shows and with other musicians.

The band performed on the title track of the 1979 Fleetwood Mac album Tusk, which went on to be a multi-platinum record. The band performed during halftime at Super Bowl XXI in 1987 and Super Bowl XXII in 1988. In 1990, the band performed live on America's Funniest Home Videos. Additionally, the band later played on another multi-platinum Fleetwood Mac album, The Dance (1997). The Spirit of Troy is the only collegiate band to have two platinum records.Press Pack – Spring 2009 , TMB SpiritNotes, Accessed May 11, 2009. In recent years, the band has appeared at the 2009 Grammy Awards, accompanying Radiohead; on the 2009 Academy Awards with Beyoncé and Hugh Jackman; and during the finale of American Idol 2008, backing Renaldo Lapuz in instrumentation of his original song, "We're Brothers Forever".Adam Rose, Trojans cementing reputation as Hollywood's band , latimes.com, February 26, 2009. Retrieved March 4, 2009. In 2009, the band played on the show Dancing with the Stars.

The USC band was only one of two American groups invited to march in the Hong Kong Chinese New Year parade in 2003 and 2004. The Trojan Marching Band performed at the 2005 World Expo in Nagoya, Japan. In May 2006, the Trojan Marching Band traveled to Italy, performing once in Florence, and twice in Rome (including in front of the Coliseum). The band has also, for many years, performed the 1812 Overture with the Los Angeles Philharmonic Orchestra (or occasionally with other orchestras) each year at the Hollywood Bowl "Tchaikovsky Spectacular".

Spirit groups

 Song Girls 
For over 45 years, the USC Song Girls have been considered the "Crown Jewels of USC Spirit". Founded in 1967, the USC Song Girls appear at football, basketball, and volleyball games as well as other sporting events, rallies, and university and alumni functions. The squad also performs internationally. The squad has traveled to Italy, Austria, France, Hungary, Czech Republic, Japan, China and Australia, most recently having traveled to Milan, Italy to perform at the 2015 World Expo on America's Independence Day. Unlike other college cheer teams, Song Girls are primarily a dance squad and do not perform gymnastics, stunts, or lead cheers. The Song Girls perform to the music of and often appear with The Spirit of Troy. Together with the Trojan Marching Band, they are a visible public face of the university and function as the ambassadors of spirit and goodwill for the Trojan Family.

 Yell Leaders 
Lindley Bothwell founded the USC Yell Leading Squad in 1919 in his first year as a student at USC. He felt that together, with a few friends, he could aid in "firing up" the crowd during football games. The USC Yell Leaders worked closely with The Spirit of Troy and the Song Girls to lead cheers and perform stunts to rally Trojan fans at football, basketball, and volleyball games. The sweater-clad team consisted of all men for most of its existence, though the squad later opened itself up to applicants from both sexes and did feature one female Yell Leader in 1998. They were disbanded by the university after the 2005–06 season and replaced by the co-ed Spirit Leaders.

 Spirit Leaders 
The USC Spirit Leaders are responsible for leading stadium wide chants and increasing crowd participation at all Trojan athletic events, including football and basketball games. Working in proud partnership with the Trojan Marching Band and the USC Song Girls, the USC Spirit Leaders help to create a winning atmosphere for all Trojan athletes.

Student media
The Daily Trojan has been the student newspaper of USC since 1912 and is a primary source of news and information for the campus. It secured the first interview of President Richard Nixon after his resignation. The publication does not receive financial aid from the university and instead runs entirely on advertisement revenue. Published from Monday to Friday during the fall and spring semesters, the newspaper turns into the Summer Trojan during the summer term and publishes once a week. It is the paper of record on campus.

KXSC (FM) is a University-of-Southern-California-owned radio station based in Sunnyvale, California, serving the San Francisco Bay Area.

KXSC (AM), previously known as KSCR, is the university's student-run college radio station, which is managed entirely by an unpaid staff of nearly 200 undergraduate and graduate student volunteers. The station gives students hands-on experience in a variety of music industry and broadcast-related positions, including live event promotion, social media management, radio production, and audio engineering. In addition to providing almost 24 hours of daily live programming, the station also hosts live events, bringing local and touring bands to campus. The station's annual KXSC Fest, which began in 2009, has played host to performers such as Nosaj Thing, Muna (band), Mika Miko, Dan Deacon, Thee Oh Sees, and Flying Lotus. KXSC traces its roots to the original KUSC, which was operated by students starting in 1946. When KUSC transitioned to classical programming and moved off-campus in the mid-1970s, a group of students reacted to renewed demand for student-run radio station and founded KSCR in 1975. KSCR was broadcast at 1560AM out of a student in the Hancock Foundation Building. In 1984, the university authorized a grant to move KSCR to a new location in Marks Hall. In 2010, KSCR adopted the call letters KXSC in order to be eligible to obtain a new FM license from the FCC, as well as to mark the station's move to a brand-new facility in the basement of the Ronald Tutor Campus Center.

Trojan Vision (often abbreviated as TV8) is the student television station at USC. TV8 was established in 1997 by the Annenberg School for Communication, but it is now a part of the School of Cinematic Arts. Trojan Vision broadcasts 24/7 from the Robert Zemeckis Center for Digital Arts to the University Park Campus on Channel 8.1 and online through their website. Programming is also made available to the greater Los Angeles community on local channel LA36. In addition to a selection of regularly airing shows of many genres, Trojan Vision also broadcasts the shows Platforum, a round-table debate show; Annenberg TV News, a news program; and CU@USC, an interview program.

El Rodeo is USC's student-run yearbook. One of the oldest student traditions at the university, the yearbook's first edition was released in 1889 and was originally called The Sybil. The name was changed to El Rodeo in 1899 to reflect the cowboy-themed events students threw to advertise the yearbook as a "roundup" of the year's events. It was long packaged with the Student Activity Card, which gave students access to all home sports games. Since the card was dissolved in 2007, the yearbook has been sold as a stand-alone item.

Greek life
The Greek community has had a long history on the campus. Centered on a portion of West 28th Street known as "The Row", between Figueroa Street and Hoover Street just north of campus, USC's Greek system began soon after the school's founding when Kappa Alpha Theta founded a chapter in 1887.

Today, the university sponsors 4 fraternities and 10 sororities in the Interfraternity Conference (IFC) and Panhellenic Conference (PHC), respectively. In 2022, 11 fraternities disaffiliated from the university to form the University Park Interfraternity Council (UPIFC). 

Outside the Panhellenic and Interfraternity conferences, the Greek community at USC is very diverse, boasting the Multicultural, Asian, Inter-Fraternity (composed of professional fraternities), and the National Pan-Hellenic (historically Black) Councils. Organizations governed by these councils include chapters of some of the oldest Latino and Black Greek organizations in the country and the oldest Asian fraternity in Southern California while also including established professional business, engineering, and pre-law fraternities, and other multiculturally based groups.

Popular media

Because of USC's proximity to Hollywood, close ties between the School of Cinematic Arts and entertainment industry, and the architecture on campus, the university has been used in numerous movies, television series, commercials, and music videos. USC is frequently used by filmmakers, standing in for numerous other universities. According to IMDB, USC's campus has been featured in at least 180 film and television titles.

Movies filmed at USC include Forrest Gump, Legally Blonde, Road Trip, The Girl Next Door, Harold & Kumar Go to White Castle, Love & Basketball, Blue Chips, Ghostbusters, Live Free or Die Hard, House Party 2, The Number 23, The Social Network and The Graduate. Television series that have used the USC campus include How to Get Away With Murder, Cold Case, Entourage, 24, The O.C., Beverly Hills, 90210, Moesha, Saved by the Bell: The College Years, The Fresh Prince of Bel-Air, House M.D., CSI: NY, Undeclared, The West Wing, Alias, The Office, Monk, The United States of Tara, Gilmore Girls, Scrubs, and The Roommate.

 Notable alumni

Among the notable alumni of the University of Southern California are prominent business leaders, astronauts, scientists, musicians, engineers, lawyers, architects, athletes, actors, politicians, and those that have gained both national and international fame. To keep alumni connected, the Trojan network consists of over 100 alumni groups on five continents. A common saying among those associated with the school is that one is a "Trojan for Life".

Notable alumni include Neil Armstrong, the first human to walk on the Moon; Charles Bolden, former director of NASA, retired United States Marine Corps Major General, and former astronaut.; O. J. Simpson, football star in the 1960s and accused murderer; Lillian Copeland, Olympic champion in discus throw; George Lucas, creator of Star Wars; Andrew Viterbi, co-founder of Qualcomm Inc. and inventor of the Viterbi algorithm; Academy Award winner John Wayne (who also played on the USC football team); actor and comedian Will Ferrell; Emmy Award-winning actor John Ritter; Pritzker Prize-winning architect Frank Gehry; Hall of Fame football player Ron Mix; one of the most influential singers in Asia Teresa Teng; longtime Los Angeles Lakers owner Jerry Buss; recycling symbol designer Gary Anderson; former Secretary of State Warren Christopher; former Prime Minister of Pakistan Zulfikar Ali Bhutto, the founder of Pakistani democracy; deposed Egyptian president Mohamed Morsi, the first democratically elected president in that country's history; actress America Ferrera; journalist Julie Chen; Michelle D. Commander, Associate Director and Curator of the Lapidus Center at the Schomburg Center for Research in Black Culture, and former Prime Minister of Jordan Fayez Tarawneh, Taiwanese actress and singer Michelle Chen.

 Notes a.  The alternative name "Southern Cal" frequently appears in sports-related news articles. USC discourages use of "Southern Cal" out of concern the name might suggest a foundational association to the University of California, Berkeley (commonly known as "Cal" in the athletics context), even though the two institutions have no affiliation other than their mutual Pac-12 membership. For several years, USC's media guides contained the following request: "Note to the media: In editorial references to athletic teams of the University of Southern California, the following are preferred: USC, Southern California, So. California, Troy and Trojans for men's or women's teams, and Women of Troy for women's teams. PLEASE do not use Southern Cal (it's like calling San Francisco 'Frisco' or North Carolina 'North Car.'). The use of 'Southern Cal' on licensed apparel and merchandise is limited in scope and necessary to protect federal trademark rights."b.  Specifically Seoul, South Korea; Hong Kong, China; Jakarta, Indonesia; Taipei, Republic of China; Mexico City; and Tokyo, Japan. USC International Officesc.  The NCAA does not conduct a championship for Football Bowl Subdivision football. Instead, teams are awarded championships by various private organizations; currently the recognized championships are awarded by the Bowl Championship Series and titles by the Associated Press.d.'  The precise colors can be found on the USC Graphic Identity Program website: the correct Pantone color for USC Cardinal is PMS 201C and USC Gold is PMS 123C.

References

External links

 
 USC Athletics website
 
 

 
Universities and colleges in Los Angeles
Private universities and colleges in California
Pharmacy schools in California
Medical schools in California
Articles containing video clips
Schools accredited by the Western Association of Schools and Colleges
National Register of Historic Places in Los Angeles
Olympic International Broadcast Centres
Venues of the 1984 Summer Olympics
Educational institutions established in 1880
1880 establishments in California
19th century in Los Angeles
South Los Angeles
University Park, Los Angeles